Sy Yabghu Qaghan was a khagan in the Western Turkic Khaganate between 631–633 or 630–632. His full title was Yǐpí (shā)bōluō sì yèhù kèhán 乙毗(沙)钵罗肆叶护可汗 (reconstructed Old Turkic: *Irbis ~ Yelbi (Ysh)bara Sir Yabghu Khagan); personal name: Ashina Xili 阿史那咥力

Reign 
He was raised to throne by the support of Nushibi (a part of the OnOk confederation) tribes as well as Nishu a cousin of him. However he was not more successful than his predecessor. He couldn't control Syr-Tardush tribes and he executed so many people that even his former partisan Nishu planned to escape. After losing his supporters and prestige he escaped to south in 633. Nishu (with titular name Dulu Khagan) succeeded him.

Later years 
He tried to raid the city of Balkh (now in north Afghanistan), but was killed in the clash.

References

Göktürk khagans
Ashina house of the Turkic Empire
633 deaths
7th-century Turkic people
Year of birth unknown